A scientific equipment optician is an individual who makes and adjusts other optical aids, including telescope optics and microscope lenses. See also Optician for individuals who make and adjust glasses.

Telescope opticians
 James Gilbert Baker
 Denis Albert Bardou
 John A. Brashear
 Laurent Cassegrain
 Henri Chrétien
 Alvan Clark
 John Dollond
 Charles Wesley Elmer and Richard Scott Perkin
 Galileo Galilei
 James Gregory
 John Hadley
 Chester Moore Hall
 Robert Hooke
 Johannes Kepler
 Frederick James Hargreaves
 Christiaan Huygens
 Hans Lippershey
 Raymond Augustin Mailhat
 Dmitri Dmitrievich Maksutov
 James Henry Marriott
 Jacob Metius
 Isaac Newton
 Georg Simon Plössl
 Russell W. Porter
 Jesse Ramsden
 George Willis Ritchey
 Christoph Scheiner
 Bernhard Schmidt
 James Short

See also Timeline of telescope technology and List of astronomical instrument makers

Microscope opticians
 Ernst Karl Abbe
 Denis Albert Bardou
 Christopher Cock
 Siegfried Czapski
 Cornelius Drebbel
 Galileo Galilei
 Robert Hooke
 Christiaan Huygens
 Carl Kellner
 Anton van Leeuwenhoek
 Moritz von Rohr

See also Timeline of microscope technology

Optical
Science occupations